The 21st Annual Gardel Awards ceremony were held on May 14, 2019. The TNT Latin America networks broadcast the show live from the Ángel Bustelo Auditorium in Mendoza. It was the first time that the ceremony was held outside Buenos Aires. The ceremony recognized the best recordings, compositions, and artists of the eligibility year, which ran from January 1, 2016 to January 31, 2016. The nominations were announced on April 16, 2019 at the Néstor Kirchner Cultural Centre in Buenos Aires.

The ceremony was hosted by Argentina model, actor and TV host Iván de Pineda. The pre-telecast ceremony was held prior to the main event and was hosted by Gabriela Radice and Luis Serrano.

Paulo Londra received the most nominations, with seven, followed by Abel Pintos and Babasónicos, with five each. Lali and Escalandrum tied for the most wins of the night with three each.

Performers

Nominees and winners
Nominees were taken from the Gardel Awards website. Winners are listed in bold.

General
Album of the Year
Prender un Fuego – Marilina Bertoldi
Cargar La Suerte – Andrés Calamaro
Discutible – Babasónicos
Studio 2 – Escalandrum
Fiesta Nacional (MTV Unplugged) – Los Auténticos Decadentes

Song of the Year
 "Sin Querer Queriendo" – Lali featuring Mau y Ricky
 "Verdades Afiladas" – Andrés Calamaro
 "La Pregunta" – Babasónicos
 "Vámonos de Viaje" – Bandalos Chinos
 "Fumar de día" – Marilina Bertoldi

Record of the Year
Studio 2 – Escalandrum
 Escalandrum & Horacio Sarria, producers; Facundo Rodríguez, engineer
Discutible – Babasónicos
 Babasónicos & Gustavo Iglesias, producers; Gustavo Iglesias & Greg Calbi, engineers
 "Amor Ausente (En Vivo)" – Eruca Sativa & Abel Pintos
 Eruca Sativa, producer; Gabriel Pedernera, engineer
 Best Seller – Juan Ingaramo
 Geiser, producer; Nico Cotton & Rafael Arcaute, engineer
 Sonido Subtropical – La Delio Valdez
 Andrés Mayo, Mariano Agustín Fernández & Delio Valdez, producers; Mariano Agustín Fernández engineer

Best New Artist
 Instanto – Destino San Javier
 BACH – Bandalos Chinos
 Teoría Espacial – Barbi Recanati
 Conociendo Rusia – Conociendo Rusia
 Clásico – Hipnótica
 Nos Vamos a Morir de Hacer Estrategias de Amor – Los Rusos Hijos de Puta
 Instanto – Destino San Javier
 Escenas de La Nada Mirar – Noelia Sinkunas
 "Adán y Eva" – Paulo Londra
 SMS – Salvapantallas

Collaboration of the Year
 "Amor Ausente (En Vivo)" – Eruca Sativa & Abel Pintos
 "No Es No" – Axel & Soledad
 "Cuando Te Besé" – Becky G & Paulo Londra
 "Un Poquito" – Diego Torres & Carlos Vives
 "Amor (En Vivo)" – Los Auténticos Decadentes featuring Mon Laferte

Best Singer-Songwriter Album
 Constelaciones en el Luna Park (En Vivo) – Lisandro Aristimuño
 40 Años – Leo Maslíah
 Instrucciones para Madurar – Roque Narvaja
 Carrousel – Silvina Garré
 La Huella en el Cemento – Sofía Viola

Pop
Best Female Pop Album
 Brava – Lali
 Popular – Maria Campos
 Un Té de Tilo Por Favor – Natalie Pérez 
 Quiero Volver – TINI 
 Solo Sé – Victoria Bernardi

Best Male Pop Album
 La Familia Festeja Fuerte (En Vivo Estadio River Plate) – Abel Pintos
 Dada – Soy Rada and the Colibriquis
 El Otro – Chano
 La Bestia de la Energía – Mauro Conforti & La Vida Marciana

Best Pop Group Album
 BACH – Bandalos Chinos
 Clásico – Hipnótica
 Un Regulo Tuyo – Rayos Laser
 SMS – Salvapantallas
 Criaturas – Ser

Rock
Best Female Rock Album
 Prender un Fuego – Marilina Bertoldi
 Del Otro Lado – Bié
 La Génesis – Hilda Lizarazu
 Heidi – Militta Bora
 Umbral – Noe Terceros

Best Male Rock Album
 Cargar la suerte – Andrés Calamaro
 Naranja Persa 2 – Ciro y los Persas
 El Vuelo del Dragon, Pt. 1 – Palo Pandolfo
 Sombras en el cielo – Raúl Porchetto
 Fervor – Rocco Posca

Best Rock Group Album
 Haciendo Cosas Raras – Divididos
Discutible – Babasónicos
 20 Años Celebrando – La Beriso 
Fiesta Nacional (MTV Unplugged) – Los Auténticos Decadentes
 Vanthra – Vanthra

Best Hard Rock/Punk Album
 Una Razón para Seguir – A.N.I.M.A.L.
 Teoría del Caos – Deja Vu
 Gritando Verdades – Horcas
 Ruta Hotel – Playa Nudista
 Sentimiento – Sonia

Urban/Trap
Best Urban/Trap Song or Album
 "Adán y Eva" – Paulo Londra
 "Cuando Te Besé" – Becky G & Paulo Londra
 "Oro Negro" – Dakillah
 "Si Te Sentis Sola" – Duki
 Tres Mil Millones de Años Luz – Emanero
 En Espiral – Lo' Pibitos
 "Fama de Puta" – Naomi Preizler
 "Chica Paranormal" – Paulo Londra
 "Dímelo" – Paulo Londra
 "Me Doy Cuenta" – Valen Etchegoyen

Best Urban/Trap Collaboration
 "Cuando Te Besé" – Becky G & Paulo Londra
 "Sin Culpa" – Duki featuring DrefQuila
 "Tres Mil Millones de Años Luz" – Emanero featuring Sony
 "De Gira" – Naomi Preizler & Under MC
 "Antireversa" – Sol Pereyra & Mula

Tango
Best Female Tango Album
 Puñal de sombra – Lidia Borda
 Azsulado – Alicia Vignola
 En la boca del león – Eva Fiori Orquesta
 Martingala – Julieta Laso
 Argentígena – María Laura Antonelli

Best Male Tango Album
 Tango Cosmopolita – Omar Mollo
 Todo es Amor – Cristian Chinellato
 Roto – Enrique Campos
 Pasional – Jorge Vazquez
 70 Años de Tango – Roberto Siri

Cuarteto
Best Cuarteto Album
 En Vivo con Amigos – Ulises Bueno
 Estamos Todos de Fiesta – Cuarteto Retro
 25 – Damián Córdoba
 Vigencia – Negro Videla
 Éxitos de Oro – Nolberto al k la

Best Cuarteto Group Album
 Obsesión – La Barra
 20 Años – La Banda al Rojo Vivo
 Animate! – Q' Lokura
 Aquellas Canciones Inolvidables – Sabroso

Tropical
Best Female Tropical Album
 La Voz de los Barrios – Rocío Quiroz
 Inigualable – Dalila
 No Te Confundas – Eugenia Quevedo
 #ATR – Jackita 
 Dos Infieles – Lumila

Best Male Tropical Album
 En el Gran Rex (En Vivo) – Néstor En Bloque
 En Vivo – Daniel Cardozo
 Barrios de Mi Tierra (Canciones de Rubén Blades) – Iván Barrios
 Entre Amantes y Enamorados – Mario Luis
 Íntimo (En Vivo) – Rodrigo Tapari

Best Tropical Group Album
 Sonido Subtropical – La Delio Valdez
 G.Y.R.D.A. – Girda y los del Alba
 ¡Echale Soda! – Orquesta Plazoleta All Stars
 La Vuelta – Roberto Edgar Volcán
 Viru Kumbieron – Viru Kumbieron

Folk
Best Female Folklore Album
 Jallalla – Micaela Chauque
 Poder Decir – Ceci Mendez
 Canto Soy – Eli Fernández
 Jaaukanigás – Patricia Gómez
 Convicción – Rocío Araujo

Best Male Folklore Album
 Violeta Azul – Abi González
 Canto a Rosario – Enrique Llopis
 A Fin de Cuentas (En Vivo) – Facundo Saravia
 Mi Cantar – Jorge Rojas
 Coplas del Violinero – Néstor Garnica

Best Folklore Group Album
 Patio – Juan Quintero, Santiago Segret & Andrés Pilar
 Instanto – Destino San Javier
 Un lugar antes de la lluvia – La Llave
 Atemporales – Las Hermanas Atemporales
 Perspectiva Interior – Los Chaza

Alternative
Best Alternative Pop Album
 Vanthra – Vanthra
 Animal – Ainda Dúo
 Conociendo Rusia – Conociendo Rusia
 Best Seller – Juan Ingaramo
 Nene Mimado – Nahuel Briones

Best Alternative Rock Album
 Matrioska – Mariana Bianchini
 Historias de Pescadores y Ladrones de La Pampa Argentina – Gabo Ferro and Sergio CH
 20 Años: El Show Más Feliz del Mundo (En Vivo) – Los Caligaris
 Vanthra – Vanthra
 Unisex – Zerokill

Best Alternative Folklore Album
 Trino – Aca Seca
 Canciones de Tucumán a Rosario – Leopoldo Deza & Litto Nebbia
 Canción Sobre Canción – Liliana Herrero
 Ese Amigo del Alma: 30 Años (En Vivo) – Lito Vitale Quinteto
 Tierra Sin Mal – Silvia Iriondo

Electronic
Best Electronic Music Album
 Universo Paralelo – Las Rositas
 Universal – Brijow
 Superbrillantes – Flavio Etcheto
 Sangre o Saliva – Lola Granillo
 Rapsodia – Mistol Team

Romantic/Melodic
Best Romantic/Melodic Album
 Porque Yo Te Amo – Gerónimo Rauch
 Con Buena Compañía – Dany Martin
 Celebrando a una Leyenda (En Vivo) – Leo Dan
 Heliotrópico – Manuel Moreira
 Románticos 60's – Palito Ortega

Music for Visual Media
Best Ciema/Television Soundtrack Album
 Notas de Paso 2 – Ernesto Snajer
 Camino Sinuoso – Fito Páez
 Caminante del Amor – Leo Sujatovich & Mateo Sujatovich
 Un Gallo para Esculapio – Pablo Borghi
 El Potro, Lo Mejor del Amor – Rodrigo Romero

Reggae/Ska
Best Reggae/Ska Album
 Caminarás Caminos – Dread Mar-I
 Neighborhood Rules – Hugo Lobo
 Amanecido – Leonchalon
 Runfla Calavera – Mamita Peyote
 Semillas de Paz – Vero y Pablo

Chamamé
Best Chamamé Album
 Cocomarola en Guitarras – Rudi Flores y Las guitarras correntinas
 Grandes Éxitos – Ernestito Montiel
 Ñande Poetas: Homenaje a Luis Landriscina – Juan Pablo Barebrán & Tajy
 En Dos Hileras – Julio Ramírez
 Franco – Lucas Monzón

Jazz
Best Jazz Album
 Studio 2 – Escalandrum
 Nude – Inés Estévez
 Lentes – Juan Cruz de Urquiza
 Love – Ligia Piro
 Danza – Mariano Otero

Classical
Best Classical Album
 Horacio Lavandera - Ludwig van Beethoven – Horacio Lavandera
 Sola Flauta Sola – Beatriz Plana
 Piezas para Piano – Diana Lopszyc & Saúl Cosentino
 Schubert: Mass No. 2 in G Major, D.167 – Estudio Coral de Buenos Aires
 Bajo Templado – Sebastián Tozzola & Anaïs Crestin

Best Instrumental Tango Orchestra Album
 Ahora y Siempre – Orquesta Típica Fernández Fierro
 Atípico – Bernardo Monk Orquesta
 Tanguera – Diego Schissi Quinteto
 Tangos de la posverdad – Juan Pablo Navarro Sexteto
 Cruces Urbanos – Quinteto Negro La Boca

World Music
Best Instrumental/Fusion/World Music Album
 Adivino del Tiempo – Marcelo Torres
 Posdata – Ensamble Chancho a Cuerda
 Todos los Nombres, Todos los Cielos – Ignacio Montoya Carlotto 
 En la montaña – Obi Homer

Children
Best Children's Album
 Magia todo el día – Luis Pescetti y amigos
 Firmamento – Dúo Karma
 Minimalitos – Magdalena Fleitas
 Barcos y Mariposas (Vol. 5) – Mariana Baggio
 Simona (Music from the TV Series) – Simona cast

Historical
Best Catalog Collection
 Satélite Cerati – Gustavo Cerati
 El Gusanito en Persona – Jorge de la Vega
 Fuiste Mía un Verano (Edición 50 Aniversario) – Leonardo Favio
 Ave Fenix 2 – Lito Vitale
 80 años - Jazztaríaenbaterita – Néstor Astarita

Recording Engineering
Recording Engineer of the Year
 Studio 2 – Escalandrum
 Facundo Rodríguez, engineer
 Best Seller – Juan Ingaramo
 Nico Cotton, engineer
 Sonido Subtropical – La Delio Valdez
 Mariano Agustín Fernández, engineer
 Prender un Fuego – Marilina Bertoldi
 Brian Taylor, engineer
 "Physical" – Octafonic
 Hector Castillo & Luciano Lucerna, engineers

Music Video/DVD
Best Music Video
 "Paren de Matarnos" – Miss Bolivia
 "La Pregunta" – Babasónicos
 "Amor Ausente (En Vivo)" – Eruca Sativa & Abel Pintos
 "La Espesura" – Paula Maffía
 "Chica Feliz" – Ser

Best DVD
 Fiesta Nacional (MTV Unplugged) – Los Auténticos Decadentes
 Fernando Emliozzi, director
 La Familia Festeja Fuerte – Abel Pintos
 Diego Alvarez, director
 Coti Sorokin Y Los Brillantes En El Teatro Colón (Live At Teatro Colón / 2018) – Coti
 Coti Sorokin & Agustina Tafet, directors
 El Vuelo del Dragon, Pt. 1 – Palo Pandolfo
 Norberto Hegoburu, director

Design
Best Cover Design
 Brava – Lali
 Molokid, graphic designer
 Satélite Cerati – Gustavo Cerati
 Alejandro Ros, graphic designer
 Best Seller – Juan Ingaramo
 Franco Ferrari, graphic designer
 Fuego Artificial – Las Ligas Menores
 Anabella Cartolano, graphic designer
 Un Té de Tilo Por Favor – Natalie Pérez 
 Gastón Garriga Lacaze, graphic designer

Archival Concept
Best Archival Concept Album
 Canción Sobre Canción – Liliana Herrero
 Carlos Villalba, Mariana Isla & Nahuel Carfi, executive producers
 Coti Sorokin Y Los Brillantes En El Teatro Colón (Live At Teatro Colón / 2018) – Coti
 Coti Sorokin, executive producer
 Línea de tiempo – Ensamble Real Book Argentina
 Esteban Sehinkman, executive producer
 Ave Fenix 2 – Lito Vitale
 Lito Vitale, executive producer
 En la Luna – Virginia Innocenti
 Virginia Innocenti & Sergio Zabala, executive producers

Multiple nominations and awards
The following received multiple nominations:

Seven:
Paulo Londra
Five:
Babasónicos
Abel Pintos
Four:
Los Auténticos Decadentes
Escalandrum
Juan Ingaramo
Marilina Bertoldi

Three:
Bandalos Chinos
Becky G
Andrés Calamaro
Eruca Sativa
La Delio Valdez
Lali

Two:
Gustavo Cerati
Coti
Destino San Javier
Duki
Emanero
Liliana Herrero
Hipnótica
Conociendo Rusia
Palo Pandolfo
Natalie Pérez
Naomi Preizler
Salvapantallas
Ser
Vanthra
Lito Vitale

The following received multiple awards:

Three:
 Lali
 Escalandrum

Two:
 Abel Pintos
 Marilina Bertoldi
 Paulo Londra

References

2019 in Latin music
2019 music awards
May 2019 events in Argentina
Song awards
Argentine music awards